David James (3 June 1791 – 1 May 1846) was an English first-class cricketer who was active in the 1810s. James, who was born in Marylebone, is recorded in two matches for Old Etonians, totalling 11 runs with a highest score of 9. He held two catches and took 3 wickets including one return of 4 wickets in an innings. He died in Lincoln's Inn, London, aged 54.

References

Bibliography
 

English cricketers
English cricketers of 1787 to 1825
Old Etonians cricketers
1791 births
1846 deaths